The Pioneers is a 1941 American Western film directed by Albert Herman and starring Tex Ritter, Karl Hackett and Wanda McKay.

Plot
A frontiersman leads a group of pioneering settlers to their new homestead.

Cast
 Tex Ritter as Tex Ritter
 Wanda McKay as Suzanna Ames
 Slim Andrews as Slim Hunkafeller 
 Red Foley as Red Foley
 Doye O'Dell as Doye O'Dell
 Del Lawrence as John Ames
 George Chesebro as Wilson - Henchman
 Karl Hackett as Carson
 Lynton Brent as Jingo - Henchman
 Gene Alsace as Sheriff
 Chief Many Treaties as Chief Warcloud
 Charles Soldani as Chief Lone Deer

References

Bibliography
 Bond, Johnny. The Tex Ritter Story. Chappell Music Company, 1976.

External links
 

1941 films
1941 Western (genre) films
American Western (genre) films
Films directed by Albert Herman
Monogram Pictures films
1940s English-language films
1940s American films